Bobkov is a Russian surname that has been borne by, among others:

 Igor Bobkov (b. 1991), ice hockey player
 Nikolai Bobkov (b. 1940), footballer
 Philipp Bobkov (1925–2019), KGB official
 Sergey Bobkov (b. 1961), mathematician

Russian-language surnames